Chaos Magick may refer to:

 Chaos magic, a postmodern magical tradition
 Chaos Magick (album), a 2015 album by Saturnian Mist